Thomas Vollnhofer (born 2 September 1984) is an Austrian footballer who plays as a goalkeeper for SKN St. Pölten II.

International career
Between 2000 and 2003, Vollnhofer was capped for various Austrian national youth teams, representing his country at under-16, under-17 and under-19 level. For the U19, he was capped a total of 13 times under coach Paul Gludovatz. He was part of the team winning the third place in the 2003 UEFA European Under-19 Championship.

Honours
Austria U19
 UEFA European Under-19 Championship third place: 2003

References

External links
 
 

1984 births
Living people
Austrian footballers
Austrian Football Bundesliga players
SC Wiener Neustadt players
SKN St. Pölten players
Association football goalkeepers
Austria youth international footballers
People from Oberpullendorf District
Footballers from Burgenland